Sally Riley (born 14 June 1990) is an Australian rules footballer who played for  and  in the AFL Women's competition.

AFLW
She was drafted by Adelaide with their fifth selection and thirty-ninth overall in the 2016 AFL Women's draft. She was named as Adelaide's inaugural co-vice-captain alongside Angela Foley in January 2017. She made her debut in the thirty-six point win against  at Thebarton Oval in the opening round of the 2017 season. She was a part of Adelaide's premiership side after the club defeated  by six points at Metricon Stadium in the AFL Women's Grand Final. She played every match in her debut season to finish with eight matches.

Adelaide signed Riley for the 2018 season during the trade period in May 2017. She was picked up by the Suns as a delisted free agent after the 2019 season. Riley played nine games for the Suns before retiring at the conclusion of the 2021 season. A strong leader, Riley was a vice-captain at Adelaide for two seasons and was in the Suns' leadership group across her two years.

References

External links 

1990 births
Living people
Adelaide Football Club (AFLW) players
Australian rules footballers from the Northern Territory
Gold Coast Football Club (AFLW) players